The 28th parallel north is a circle of latitude that is 28 degrees north of the Earth's equatorial plane. It crosses Africa, Asia, the Pacific Ocean, North America and the Atlantic Ocean.

In Mexico the parallel defines the border between the states of Baja California and Baja California Sur.

This parallel also passes through Mount Everest, the tallest mountain on Earth, passing just north of its summit.

At this latitude the sun is visible for 13 hours, 55 minutes during the summer solstice and 10 hours, 22 minutes during the winter solstice.

Around the world
Starting at the Prime Meridian and heading eastwards, the parallel 28° north passes through:

{| class="wikitable plainrowheaders"
! scope="col" width="125" | Co-ordinates
! scope="col" | Country, territory or sea
! scope="col" | Notes
|-
| 
! scope="row" | 
|
|-
| 
! scope="row" | 
|
|-
| 
! scope="row" | 
|
|-
| style="background:#b0e0e6;" | 
! scope="row" style="background:#b0e0e6;" | Red Sea
| style="background:#b0e0e6;" | Gulf of Suez
|-
| 
! scope="row" | 
| Sinai Peninsula - passing just north of Sharm El Sheikh
|-
| style="background:#b0e0e6;" | 
! scope="row" style="background:#b0e0e6;" | Red Sea
| style="background:#b0e0e6;" | Straits of Tiran
|-
| 
! scope="row" | 
| Island of Tiran
|-
| style="background:#b0e0e6;" | 
! scope="row" style="background:#b0e0e6;" | Red Sea
| style="background:#b0e0e6;" |
|-
| 
! scope="row" | 
|
|-
| style="background:#b0e0e6;" | 
! scope="row" style="background:#b0e0e6;" | Persian Gulf
| style="background:#b0e0e6;" |
|-
| 
! scope="row" | 
|
|-valign="top"
| 
! scope="row" | 
| Balochistan Sindh Punjab
|-
| 
! scope="row" | 
| Rajasthan
|-
| 
! scope="row" | 
| Punjab
|-valign="top"
| 
! scope="row" | 
| Rajasthan Haryana Rajasthan Haryana Uttar Pradesh
|-
| 
! scope="row" | 
|
|-
| 
! scope="row" | 
| Tibet - for about 14 km
|-
| 
! scope="row" | 
| For about 11 km
|-
| 
! scope="row" | 
| Tibet - for about 30 km
|-
| 
! scope="row" | 
| Mount Everest lies on the parallel as it crosses from Nepal to China
|-
| 
! scope="row" | 
| Tibet
|-
| 
! scope="row" | 
| Sikkim
|-
| 
! scope="row" | 
| Tibet
|-
| 
! scope="row" | 
|
|-
| 
! scope="row" | 
| Tibet - for about 15 km
|-
| 
! scope="row" | 
|
|-
| 
! scope="row" | 
| Tibet
|-valign"top"
| 
! scope="row" | 
| Arunachal Pradesh - partly claimed by 
|-
| 
! scope="row" |  (Burma)
|
|-valign="top"
| 
! scope="row" | 
| Yunnan Sichuan Yunnan Sichuan Yunnan Sichuan Guizhou Hunan Jiangxi Fujian Zhejiang - passing through Wenzhou
|-
| style="background:#b0e0e6;" | 
! scope="row" style="background:#b0e0e6;" | East China Sea
| style="background:#b0e0e6;" |
|-valign="top"
| style="background:#b0e0e6;" | 
! scope="row" style="background:#b0e0e6;" | Pacific Ocean
| style="background:#b0e0e6;" | Passing through the Amami Islands,  Passing just north of the Bonin Islands,  Passing just south of Midway Atoll,  Passing just north of Pearl and Hermes Atoll, Hawaii,  Passing just south of Cedros Island, 
|-valign="top"
| 
! scope="row" | 
| Baja California/Baja California Sur border
|-
| style="background:#b0e0e6;" | 
! scope="row" style="background:#b0e0e6;" | Gulf of California
| style="background:#b0e0e6;" |
|-
| 
! scope="row" | 
| Passing 4 km north of Guaymas
|-
| 
! scope="row" |  
| Texas - mainland and San José Island
|-
| style="background:#b0e0e6;" | 
! scope="row" style="background:#b0e0e6;" | Gulf of Mexico
| style="background:#b0e0e6;" |
|-
| 
! scope="row" |  
| Florida - island of Clearwater Beach and the mainland
|-
| style="background:#b0e0e6;" | 
! scope="row" style="background:#b0e0e6;" | Atlantic Ocean
| style="background:#b0e0e6;" | Passing just south of the island of La Gomera, 
|-
| 
! scope="row" | 
| Island of Tenerife
|-
| style="background:#b0e0e6;" | 
! scope="row" style="background:#b0e0e6;" | Atlantic Ocean
| style="background:#b0e0e6;" |
|-
| 
! scope="row" | 
| Island of Gran Canaria
|-
| style="background:#b0e0e6;" | 
! scope="row" style="background:#b0e0e6;" | Atlantic Ocean
| style="background:#b0e0e6;" | Passing just south of the island of Fuerteventura, 
|-
| 
! scope="row" | 
|
|-
| 
! scope="row" | 
|
|}

28th parallel north in popular culture 
 Twenty Eighth Parallel, by Vangelis, from the album Conquest of Paradise.

See also
27th parallel north
29th parallel north

References

n28
Borders of Mexico